Paul Franklin Crouch /kraʊtʃ/ (March 30, 1934 – November 30, 2013) was an American television evangelist. Crouch and his wife, Jan, founded the Trinity Broadcasting Network (TBN) in 1973; the company has been described as "the world’s largest religious television network."

Biography
Crouch was born in St. Joseph, Missouri, the third son of oft-traveling Assemblies of God missionaries, Andrew F. Crouch (January 7, 1889 – June 1, 1941) and wife, the former Sara Swingle (September 26, 1891 – September 29, 1976). Crouch had two older brothers, the Rev. Philip Crouch (1918–2005), and John Mark Crouch (1923–1991). Crouch, whose father died when he was seven years old, was mainly raised by his mother with the help of his grandparents. He soon became interested in amateur radio and announced he would use such technology to send the Gospel around the world. He graduated from the Central Bible College (Assemblies of God) in Springfield, Missouri in 1955 with a degree in theology.

Crouch also received three honorary doctorates: a Doctor of Litterarum (D.Litt.) on May 29, 1981, from the California Graduate School of Theology, Glendale, California; a Doctor of Divinity on May 29, 1983, from the American Christian Theological Seminary, Anaheim, California; and a Doctor of Laws degree on May 5, 1985, from Oral Roberts University, Tulsa, Oklahoma.

Crouch and Janice Bethany met in 1957 and were married in Missouri. They have two sons, Paul Crouch, Jr. and Matthew Crouch.

Early broadcasting career
Crouch began his career in broadcasting by helping to build an educational AM station (KCBI) on campus while a student at Central Bible Institute and Seminary. In 1957 he became a radio announcer at KRSD in Rapid City, South Dakota, and progressed rapidly to program director. Shortly thereafter he was promoted to manager of sister station KRSD-TV, the NBC affiliate in Rapid City.

In 1961, he was appointed by the general council of the Assemblies of God to organize and operate their newly formed Department of Television and Film Production in Burbank, California, a position he held for four years. Crouch was responsible for the ongoing production of films focusing largely on foreign missions and foreign missionary works, as well as the Assemblies of God's large inventory of audiovisual materials and children's teaching aids.

From 1965 to 1970 Crouch was general manager of KREL radio in Corona, California. In 1966, he purchased a minority stock interest in KREL. During his time at KREL, he successfully completed the station's application for an increase in power to 5,000 watts.

After leaving KREL in 1970, Crouch was invited to serve as general manager for KHOF-FM and KHOF-TV in San Bernardino, California.

Trinity Broadcasting Network (TBN) history

Crouch left KHOF in 1973 and with his wife, Jan, founded the Trinity Broadcasting Network (TBN) along with Jim and Tammy Faye Bakker (the Bakkers left in 1975). In 1974, TBN purchased its first TV station, KLXA-TV (now KTBN-TV). Since then, TBN has grown to become the United States' largest Christian television network, and the third largest group owner of broadcast TV stations in the  U.S., with CBS, FOX, and NBC holding fourth, fifth and sixth place, according to TV News Check's annual listing of the Top 30 Station Groups. Forbes.com indicated that Paul F. Crouch had compensation of $402,244 in the Fiscal Year ending on 12/31/08.

TBN is viewed globally on 70 satellites and over 18,000 TV and cable affiliates. TBN is also seen on the web globally. TBN is carried on over 287 television stations in the U.S. and on thousands of other cable television and satellite systems around the world in over 75 countries, where their programming is translated into over eleven languages. He was also executive producer for such Christian films as China Cry (1990), The Omega Code (1999), Carman: The Champion (2001), Megiddo: The Omega Code 2 (2001), and Time Changer (2002).

In the U.S., TBN's coverage grew through agreements with national cable operators. TBN is viewed via major cable and satellite companies such as Comcast, Cox, Time Warner, Verizon FIOS, DirecTV, AT&T, Dish Network, and Charter.

In addition to TBN, Crouch and his wife developed and oversaw operations for TBN's affiliated television networks: Smile of a Child – children's channel, JCTV – youth network, The Church Channel, TBN Enlace USA – Spanish language network, TBNE-Italian, The Healing Channel – Arabic language network, TBN-Russia, TBN Nejat TV – Persian-language channel, and TBN-HD, TBN's new high definition network.

Death
Crouch died at his home in Orange, California, on November 30, 2013, after 10 years with degenerative heart disease.

Criticisms and controversies
In 2000, Crouch was sued for $40 million by author Sylvia Fleener, who accused Crouch of plagiarism in his popular end-times novel (and subsequent movie), The Omega Code. Fleener's lawsuit alleged that the movie's plot was taken from her own novel, The Omega Syndrome. A former Crouch personal assistant, Kelly Whitmore, revealed that she had encountered a loose-leaf binder in Jan Crouch's luggage that the Crouches referred to as "the End Times project" and that he often called it "The Omega" but said he disliked the working title, "especially the word 'Syndrome'. After the defendant's motion for summary judgment failed the case was settled out of court for an undisclosed sum.

In September 2004, the Los Angeles Times reported that in 1998 Crouch paid Enoch Lonnie Ford, a former employee, a $425,000 formal settlement to end a wrongful termination lawsuit. The paper also reported that Ford had alleged a sexual relationship between the two men. TBN officials denied the allegations. On March 15, 2005, Ford appeared at the taping of the ION Television show Lie Detector. The show's producers decided not to air the show, and the outcome of the lie detector test was never released.

A May 2012 New York Times article reported on the personal spending of Paul and Jan Crouch, including "his-and-her mansions one street apart in a gated community" in Newport Beach, California. Paul Crouch received $400,000 in executive salary as president and his wife $365,000 as first vice president of TBN. Brittany Koper, a granddaughter of the Crouches who had authority over finances, claimed that TBN appeared to have violated the IRS ban on "excess compensation" by nonprofit organizations.

Bibliography
 Hello World!  A Personal Message to the Body of Christ. (autobiography) (Nelson, 2003) 
 I Had No Father But God
 The Omega Code: Another Has Risen from the Dead
 Megiddo: The Omega Code 2
 Shadow of the Apocalypse. (Berkley Trade, October 5, 2004)

Awards and citations
 Parents Television Council Seal of Approval for TBN
 Parents Television Council Seal of Approval for JCTV (now JUCE TV)
 Parents Television Council Seal of Approval for Smile of a Child TV
 Appointed by President Ronald Reagan to the Private Sector Initiative Project
 In May, 2009, the United Nations officially recommended the Smile of a Child Foundation to receive special consultative status with the Economic and Social Council for the Democracy Coalition Project

References

External links

 
 

1934 births
2013 deaths
American evangelists
Film producers from Missouri
American television evangelists
American television company founders
Assemblies of God people
Christians from Missouri
Oral Roberts University people
People from St. Joseph, Missouri
Central Bible College alumni
Crouch family
Pentecostals from California
Burials at Pacific View Memorial Park